Bolshakov may refer to:
Nikolay Bolshakov (born 1967), Soviet and Russian cross-country skier
Aleksei Bolshakov (born 1966), former Soviet and Russian football player
Denis Bolshakov (born 1987), Russian footballer
Dmitri Bolshakov (born 1980), Russian footballer
Georgi Bolshakov (1922-1989), Soviet GRU officer and secret diplomat in Washington, D.C.
Sergei Bolshakov (born 1996), Russian ice hockey player
Sergey Bolshakov (born 1988), Russian swimmer

Russian-language surnames